Isosulfan blue, sold under the brand name Lymphazurin among others, is a contrast agent medication used to delineate the lymphatic vessels during a lymphography procedure.

References

External links 
 
 
 

Radiocontrast agents